Kulgera is a locality in the Northern Territory of Australia. It sits on the junction of the Stuart Highway and the road to Aputula. In the 2006 Australian census it had a population of 50.

History
Kulgera is the Pitjantjatjara name for an outcrop of granite rocks just east of the settlement. According to Nicolas Rothwell, Kulgera is derived from kalgka in the Pertam language of the mountains and that word "refers to a particularly private recess of a private part of the female anatomy".

Transport
Kulgera is located on Stuart Highway. It is served by Greyhound Australia. Being the closest settlement to the South Australia/Northern Territory border makes it a well-known locality among travellers.

Kulgera railway station is 12 km east of the settlement on the Adelaide–Darwin railway. The Ghan, run by Great Southern Rail between Adelaide and Darwin arrives twice weekly in each direction.

Kulgera Airport (IATA: KGR, ICAO: YKUL) is adjacent to the settlement but is served only by charter flights.

Climate
Climate staticstics were monitored in Kulgera since 1968.

In popular culture
Kulgera features in the Redgum song "Lear Jets Over Kulgera" from their 1981 album Brown Rice and Kerosine.

References

Towns in the Northern Territory